Brain and Cognition is an American scientific journal founded in 1982. It covers the fields of cognitive neuroscience and psychophysiology.

According to the Journal Citation Reports, the journal has a 2016 impact factor of 2.432, ranking it 160th out of 253 journals in the category "Neurosciences", and 31st out of 84 journals in the category "Psychology, experimental".

References 

9 times per year journals
Elsevier academic journals
Publications established in 1982
Neuroscience journals
Cognitive science journals
1982 establishments in the United States